The Council for National Defence and Security is an agency of the Socialist Republic of Vietnam, tasked with overseeing the defence and security of the country during a state of emergency or war.

History
The Council for National Defence and Security of the Socialist Republic of Vietnam traces its roots to the Supreme National Defence Council of the Democratic Republic of Vietnam, established in 1948. In 1960, under the new constitution adopted in 1959, the name of the agency became the National Defence Council. The Council for National Defence and Security took its current form in 1992 when a new constitution was promulgated.

Organisation and membership

Under the Constitution of the Socialist Republic of Vietnam, the President of Vietnam is the commander-in-chief of the Vietnam People's Armed Forces, and the ex officio chair of the Council for National Defence and Security. The President nominates a list of members of the Council to the National Assembly for confirmation. Members of the Council need not be members of the National Assembly.

The Council operates based on majority rule.

The current membership of the Council includes: Nguyen Xuan Phuc, President and chair of the Council; Pham Minh Chinh, Prime Minister and vice chair of the Council; Vuong Dinh Hue, Chairman of the National Assembly; General Phan Van Giang, Minister of Defence; General To Lam, Minister of Public Security; Bui Thanh Son, Minister of Foreign Affairs.

Role
The Council for National Defence and Security has the responsibility to mobilise all resources, including manpower and materials, for national security and defence. Under the constitution, in the case of war, the National Assembly may delegate to the Council special responsibilities and powers, including declaring states of emergency, and mandating actions by the government, military, public security forces, and foreign affairs officials. The chair of the Council can delegate his authority as commander-in-chief to the Minister of Defence as necessary.

Proposal and petition

Vietnam passed a law defense power and the people's legitimate rights and security forces people like content security strategy doctrine National Socialist republic Vietnam the new period.

List of chairmen

References

Politics of Vietnam
Military of Vietnam
Vietnam